George in Civvy Street is a 1946 British comedy film directed and produced by Marcel Varnel starring George Formby with Ronald Shiner, and Ian Fleming. It was made by the British subsidiary of Columbia Pictures. This was Formby's last big screen appearance. After the film was unsuccessful at the box office, he resumed his career in the music hall. The working title for the film was "Remember the Unicorn".

Plot summary
This comedy film portrays George Formby leaving the forces and becoming a village pub owner, who works to turn a waitress from her current boss, a rival pub owner. Formby falls in love with the waitress, and various battles ensue between the pub rivals.

Cast
 George Formby as George Harper
 Rosalyn Boulter as Mary Colton
 Ronald Shiner as Fingers
 Ian Fleming as Uncle Shad
 Wally Patch as Sprout
 Philippa Hiatt as Lavender
 Enid Cruickshank as Miss Gummidge
 Robert Ginns as Crabtree
 Mike Johnson as Toby
 Frank Drew  as Jed
 Daphne Elphinstone as Mitzi Montrose
 Johnny Claes as himself
 Ronnie Scott as Band member
 Rita Varian as Mrs Brindle

Critical reception
 According to TV Guide, the film is "lifeless farce", and a "tasteless romp".
 A reviewer for Sky Movies wrote, "the partnership of music hall favourite George Formby and director Marcel Varnel (who also turned out the best of the Will Hay and Arthur Askey comedies) was looking distinctly jaded after six movies in a row. And despite a formidable array of four new writers, this stale comedy about pub rivalry, ended Formby's screen career on a low note".

References

External links
 
 
 

1946 films
1946 comedy films
British comedy films
Columbia Pictures films
1940s English-language films
Films directed by Marcel Varnel
Films produced by Marcel Varnel
British black-and-white films
1940s British films